Virudhunagar Lok Sabha constituency is one of the 39 Lok Sabha (parliamentary) constituencies in Tamil Nadu, a state in southern India.

Assembly Segments 
Virudhunagar Lok Sabha constituency comprises the following legislative assembly segments:

List of members of parliament

Election Results

General Election 2019

General Election 2014

General Election 2009

See also
 Lok Sabha
 Parliament of India
 Virudhunagar district
 List of Constituencies of the Lok Sabha

References

External links 
Election Commission of India
Virudhunagar Lok Sabha - Result University
Virudhunagar lok sabha  constituency election 2019 date and schedule

Lok Sabha constituencies in Tamil Nadu
Virudhunagar district